Dharmaraj Rasalam  is a bishop in the Church of South India: he has been Bishop of South Kerala since 2011 and Moderator of the Church of South India since 2020.

Rasalam was born in 1956 at Venganoor and educated at the University of Kerala. He was ordained in  1987. Since 2012, he has been implicated in various civil and criminal cases attributed to financial irregularities and abuse of power.

Notes

 

21st-century Anglican bishops in India
Indian bishops
Indian Christian religious leaders
Anglican bishops of South Kerala
Living people
University of Kerala alumni
1956 births
Moderators of the Church of South India